Titusji  was one of the 78 marchers selected by Mahatma Gandhi to take part in the 1930 Dandi March, to break the salt law. He served as governing secretary for Gandhi's Sabarmati Ashram milk project near Ahmedabad. Gulzarilal Nanda, who later became Prime Minister of India, was the secretary of another unit. Both of them were trusted friends of Gandhi.  His given name was Titus Theverthundiyil, while "Titusji" was the honorific given to him by Mahatma Gandhi.

Gandhi's visit to Kerala
On 15 March 1925, Mahatma Gandhi visited Titusji’s house in Maramon (Theverthundiyil) on his way to the famous Hindu temple in Aranmula near Chengannur. This was considered one of the greatest events in Central Travancore. In and around Maramon, thousands witnessed his visit.

Early and later life
Titusji was born to a Marthoma Syrian Christian family.
After Independence, Titusji settled in Bhopal. In 1970, he published the book "The Bharat of my Dreams".
He was represented in the early 500 Rs note.
He died on 8 August 1980, at the Kasthurba Hospital in Bhopal. Titusji donated half of the portion of his land to the Mar Thoma Syrian Church in Bhopal.

References 

1905 births
1980 deaths
Malayali people
Sam Higginbottom University of Agriculture, Technology and Sciences alumni
People from Pathanamthitta district
Indian independence activists from Kerala
Gandhians
Saint Thomas Christians